John Stanley Hansen II (born August 29, 1949) is an American retired professional wrestler.

Hansen is known for his stiff wrestling style, which he attributes to his poor eyesight. He is also known for his gimmick as a loud, violent cowboy who wanted to fight everybody, which he further emphasized by appearing in interviews with a cowboy hat, leather vest and bullrope while often chewing on tobacco. Considered the most successful and popular gaijin in Japanese professional wrestling history, he became more well-known and revered in Japan than in his native United States. In Japan's AJPW promotion, he held seven different championships. Overall he is a ten-time world champion.

In 1989, he played a small role in the movie No Holds Barred and in 2011, released his co-written biography, The Last Outlaw.

Football career
Hansen played college football for the West Texas State Buffaloes.

Professional wrestling career

Early career (1973–1980) 
Hansen made his professional wrestling debut in 1973, grappling part-time while trying to make it as an American football player. The following year, he tried out for the Detroit Wheels the short-lived World Football League, but did not make the team, and so began wrestling full-time. In 1975, Hansen first teamed with future partner Frank Goodish, who later adopted the ring name Bruiser Brody, while competing in Leroy McGuirk's Tri-State territory.

World Wide/World Wrestling Federation (1976, 1980–1981) 
In 1976, Hansen made his debut for the World Wide Wrestling Federation (WWWF) and only two months after he began competing for the company, he began feuding with the WWF Heavyweight Champion Bruno Sammartino over the title. During a title match, Hansen broke Sammartino's neck while they were wrestling and it was from this incident that both Hansen and promoters claimed that Sammartino's injury came about from the enormous power of his lariat. However, a botched powerslam is what actually caused Sammartino's injury.

After Sammartino recovered, Hansen faced him for the WWWF Heavyweight Championship once again, at Showdown at Shea, but was unsuccessful. He left the promotion soon after. He returned in 1980, rekindling his feud with Sammartino and facing Pedro Morales and Andre the Giant on several occasions. He also developed a heated feud with the then-WWF Champion Bob Backlund which culminated in a steel cage match at Madison Square Garden.

New Japan Pro-Wrestling (1977–1981, 1990) 
Hansen first came to New Japan Pro-Wrestling (NJPW) in January 1977 through the booking of Vince McMahon Sr.  With his "reputation" as the man who broke Bruno Sammartino's neck, Hansen quickly became a top heel, facing Antonio Inoki and other top New Japan stars like Seiji Sakaguchi and Tatsumi Fujinami.  In addition, while touring Japan regularly, he faced top American wrestlers including Andre the Giant, Dusty Rhodes, Bob Backlund, and Hulk Hogan. Hansen established himself as a dominant force in Japan by competing in New Japan's MSG (Madison Square Garden) tournament between 1978 and 1981. Hansen would win the NWF World Title from Antonio Inoki on February 8, 1980, one of the only two wrestlers to dethrone Inoki during his seven-year reign. From November 21 to December 13, 1980, Hansen did a tour for NJPW, where he competed in the first MSG Tag League tournament (later renamed the G1 Tag League). He teamed with Hulk Hogan, but they failed to win. He returned that April to wrestle Antonio Inoki in an unsuccessful match. However, he defeated Inoki via countout in a MSG League match on May 20, 1981, after hitting a lariat on Inoki, knocking him off the apron. He returned for several more one-off shows until leaving the promotion in December 1981.

Hansen returned at NJPW's Super Fight In Tokyo Dome event in 1990, where he had an infamous inter-promotional match against Vader. The match for the IWGP Heavyweight Championship saw Big Van Vader (representing New Japan, while Hansen represented All Japan) get struck in the nose during the entrances by Hansen's Bullrope, breaking it. Both men were known to use a stiff style of wrestling, resulting in a nasty exchange where each man threw legitimate punches, during which Hansen unintentionally poked Vader's left eye with his thumb during their brawl, causing the eye to pop out of its socket. After removing his mask, Vader pushed the eye back into its socket and held it in place with his eyelid. The match ended in a draw. Hansen returned in June for a few more matches, teaming twice with Riki Choshu and once with The Pegasus Kid.

All Japan Pro Wrestling (1981–1990) 
In 1981, Hansen abruptly left NJPW to join All Japan Pro Wrestling (AJPW). While in AJPW, Hansen became the only man to pin Antonio Inoki and Giant Baba in championship singles matches. He continued wrestling from 1982 to 1999 in World's Strongest Tag Determination League. He wrestled primarily in tag matches, where he formed many teams with the likes of Bruiser Brody, Terry Gordy, Ted DiBiase, Genichiro Tenryu, Dan Spivey, Bobby Duncum Jr., and Big Van Vader. Hansen also engaged in a renowned brawl with André the Giant in Japan.

On April 13, 1990, the World Wrestling Federation and AJPW held a supershow called Wrestling Summit at the Tokyo Dome in Tokyo, in which Hansen lost to Hulk Hogan in the main event. Hansen won his first Triple Crown Heavyweight Championship by defeating Terry Gordy on June 8, 1990, and wrestled a rematch in NJPW against Vader on June 12.

American Wrestling Association (1985–1986) 
Hansen competed in the American Wrestling Association (AWA) from 1985 to 1986. He won the World Heavyweight Championship on December 29, 1985, from Rick Martel. On June 29, 1986, he no-showed a title defense against the number one contender Nick Bockwinkel due to disagreements with management, forcing the AWA to default the title to Bockwinkel. Rumors suggest that Hansen was actually in the building that evening and had been informed by AWA promoter Verne Gagne of the pending loss to Bockwinkel. Hansen allegedly called All Japan Pro Wrestling president Giant Baba to ask if losing the championship was acceptable, but Baba had already lined up challengers for Hansen and did not permit Hansen to drop the championship. In the end, Hansen refused to drop the title to Bockwinkel and was stripped of the championship; Bockwinkel was given one of the tag team belts, which was then billed as the AWA World Heavyweight Championship due to Hansen still possessing the true title belt. Hansen immediately returned to Japan and defended the AWA World Heavyweight Championship, despite being stripped of it. The AWA threatened legal action if Hansen continued to carry the belt and refer to himself as the organization's champion, so Hansen responded by running over the belt with his truck and mailing it back with the mud tracks still on it. This chain of events was reviewed in an interview with Hansen at an NWA Legends convention, in which he expressed regret over the way he handled the situation and ultimately complimented Gagne.

World Championship Wrestling (1990–1991) 
In late 1990, Hansen began appearing in World Championship Wrestling (WCW), feuding with Lex Luger over the NWA United States Heavyweight Championship. On October 27 at Halloween Havoc, Hansen defeated Luger to win the title, ending Luger's record-setting reign at 523 days. On December 16 at Starrcade, Hansen lost the title back to Luger in a bullrope match. During this period, Hansen continued working tours for All Japan, teaming with Dan Spivey to finish second in the World's Strongest Tag Determination League in November and December. Hansen wrestled another rematch with Vader at the WrestleWar pay-per-view in February 1991. On April 18, Hansen and Spivey won the AJPW World Tag Team Championship from Terry Gordy and Steve Williams, and teamed occasionally upon their return to WCW. In June, Hansen left WCW and returned full-time to All Japan after a disagreement over an idea to group him with The Desperados, a trio of bumbling cowboys looking for Hansen through a series of vignettes. His last WCW match occurred on June 23 in Atlanta. As a result of his departure, The Desperados' angle was dropped and the trio was quickly dissolved.

Eastern Championship Wrestling (1993) 
In August 1993 Hansen made his Eastern Championship Wrestling (ECW) debut in Philadelphia. His first match he defeated ECW TV Champion Jimmy Snuka by disqualification. Hansen's last ECW appearance was at ECW UltraClash 1993 pay-per-view where he teamed with Terry Funk defeating Abdullah the Butcher and Kevin Sullivan by disqualification.

Return to AJPW (1991–2001) 
Upon his return to AJPW, Hansen began a major feud with Mitsuharu Misawa, during which time they traded the Triple Crown Championship between one another. Following Giant Baba's death, Misawa became the new booker and quickly began de-emphasizing Hansen and other foreign talent, in favor of new native recruits such as Takao Omori and Yoshihiro Takayama.

In 2000, Misawa and all but two natives defected from the promotion and formed Pro Wrestling Noah (NOAH), although Hansen chose to remain loyal to AJPW instead of joining the talent exodus. Despite remaining with AJPW, Hansen's ongoing lumbago at the time began to worsen, which ultimately lead him to wrestle his final singles match on October 21, 2000, as part of a tournament for the vacant Triple Crown Heavyweight Championship. Hansen lost the semi-final match to old partner Genichiro Tenryu, who went on to win the tournament and the title. His last match altogether was a six-man bout on the 28th, in which he, Steve Williams and Wolf Hawkfield lost to Johnny Smith, Yoshiaki Fujiwara and Masanobu Fuchi.

Hansen announced his retirement on January 28, 2001, during the Giant Baba Memorial Spectacular event.

Post-retirement 
Soon after retiring, Hansen successfully underwent surgery on his back and knees, the latter of which were both replaced. After recovering, he became the commissioner of AJPW's Pacific Wrestling Federation championship governing body, which saw him appear during Triple Crown and World Tag Team Championship matches to issue proclamations of the matches. In July 2007, Hansen voluntarily resigned from the position, with Hiroshi Hase replacing him.

On April 2, 2016, Hansen was inducted into the WWE Hall of Fame by his rival and friend Vader.

Personal life 
In 1989, Hansen had a small role in the World Wrestling Federation-produced movie No Holds Barred, which starred Hulk Hogan.

Hansen has four children. He has an eldest son, John Stanley Hansen III and daughter, Elizabeth Paige Hardee, née Hansen, from his first marriage. He had two more children with his current wife Yumi, Shaver (born December 19, 1987) played baseball at Baylor University before being drafted by the Seattle Mariners as the second pick in the sixth round of the 2009 Major League Baseball Draft. His younger son, Samuel (born February 21, 1991), is also a baseball player and played for the University of Texas at Arlington.

Other media

Filmography 
 No Holds Barred (1989) as "Neanderthal"

Books 
 The Last Outlaw (August 8, 2011)

Championships and accomplishments 

 All Japan Pro Wrestling
NWA International Heavyweight Championship (1 time)
 NWA International Tag Team Championship (1 time) – with Ron Bass
 NWA United National Championship (1 time)
 PWF World Heavyweight Championship (4 times)
 PWF World Tag Team Championship (4 times) – with Bruiser Brody (1), Ted DiBiase (2) and Austin Idol (1)
 Triple Crown Heavyweight Championship (4 times)
 World Tag Team Championship (8 times) – with Terry Gordy (2), Genichiro Tenryu (3), Dan Spivey (1), Ted DiBiase (1) and Gary Albright (1)
 Champion Carnival (1992, 1993)
 World's Strongest Tag Determination League (1983) – with Bruiser Brody
 World's Strongest Tag Determination League (1985) – with Ted DiBiase
 World's Strongest Tag Determination League (1988) – with Terry Gordy
 World's Strongest Tag Determination League (1989) – with Genichiro Tenryu
 January 2 Korakuen Hall Heavyweight Battle Royal (1994)
 World's Strongest Tag Determined League Exciting Award (1982) – with Bruiser Brody
 World's Strongest Tag Determination League Distinguished Award (1990, 1991) - with Dan Spivey
 American Wrestling Association
 AWA World Heavyweight Championship (1 time)
 Cauliflower Alley Club
 Other honoree (1996)
 Continental Wrestling Association
 CWA International Heavyweight Championship (1 time)
 George Tragos/Lou Thesz Professional Wrestling Hall of Fame
 Frank Gotch Award (2017)
 Georgia Championship Wrestling
 NWA Columbus Heavyweight Championship (1 time)
 NWA Georgia Heavyweight Championship (2 times)
 NWA Georgia Tag Team Championship (3 times) – with Tommy Rich (2) and Ole Anderson (1)
 Mid-Atlantic Championship Wrestling/World Championship Wrestling
 NWA United States Heavyweight Championship (1 time)1
 NWA World Tag Team Championship (Mid-Atlantic version) (1 time) – with Ole Anderson
 NWA Big Time Wrestling
 NWA Texas Tag Team Championship (1 time) – with Killer Tim Brooks
 NWA Texas Heavyweight Championship (1 time)
 NWA Tri-State
 NWA North American Heavyweight Championship (Tri-State version) (1 time)
 NWA United States Tag Team Championship (Tri-State version) (2 time) – with Frank Goodish
 National Wrestling Federation
 NWF Heavyweight Championship (1 time)
 New Japan Pro-Wrestling
Greatest 18 Club inductee
Professional Wrestling Hall of Fame and Museum
 Class of 2010
 Pro Wrestling Illustrated
 Match of the Year (1976) vs. Bruno Sammartino on June 25
 Most Hated Wrestler of the Year (1976)
 Ranked #24 of the top 500 singles wrestlers in the PWI 500 in 1991
 Ranked #16 of the top 500 singles of the "PWI Years" in 2003
 Ranked #7, #24, #34, and #66 of the top 100 tag teams of the "PWI Years" with Bruiser Brody, Ted DiBiase, Terry Gordy, and Ole Anderson, respectively, in 2003
 Texas Wrestling Hall of Fame
 Class of 2014
 Tokyo Sports
 Best Foreigner Award (1982)
 Best Tag Team Award (1998) with Vader
 Lifetime Achievement Award (2000)
 Match of the Year Award (1992) vs. Toshiaki Kawada on June 5
 Match of the Year Award (1982) vs. Giant Baba on February 4
 Match of the Year Award (1988) vs. Genichiro Tenryu on July 27
 Popularity Award (1980)
 Wrestling Observer Newsletter
 Best Brawler (1985, 1990)
 Tag Team of the Year (1982) with Ole Anderson
 Wrestling Observer Newsletter Hall of Fame (Class of 1996)
 WWE
WWE Hall of Fame (Class of 2016)

1 Hansen won the championship after Ted Turner purchased Mid-Atlantic Championship Wrestling from Jim Crockett Jr. and renamed the promotion World Championship Wrestling. Hansen's reign was also prior to the championship being renamed the WCW United States Heavyweight Championship.

References

External links 

 Professional Wrestling Hall of Fame profile
 
 

1949 births
American male film actors
American male professional wrestlers
American people of Danish descent
AWA World Heavyweight Champions
Detroit Wheels players
Expatriate professional wrestlers in Japan
Living people
NWA/WCW/WWE United States Heavyweight Champions
People from Borger, Texas
People from Knox City, Texas
Professional wrestlers from Texas
Professional Wrestling Hall of Fame and Museum
The Heenan Family members
West Texas A&M Buffaloes football players
WWE Hall of Fame inductees
Stampede Wrestling alumni
20th-century professional wrestlers
21st-century professional wrestlers
World Tag Team Champions (AJPW)
Triple Crown Heavyweight Champions
AWA International Heavyweight Champions
NWF Heavyweight Champions
NWA United National Champions
NWA International Heavyweight Champions
WCW World Tag Team Champions
NWA International Tag Team Champions
PWF World Heavyweight Champions
PWF World Tag Team Champions
NWA Georgia Tag Team Champions
NWA National Television Champions